Macropodanthus cootesii, known as Cootes' macropodanthus, is a species from the family Orchidaceae that is endemic to the Philippines. It is named after Australian Orchid Enthusiast Jim Cootes. Macropodanthus cootesii was only described in December 2010, by Dr. George Tiong, in the German journal Die Orchidee.

References

External links

Endemic orchids of the Philippines
Aeridinae
Species described in 2010